Péter Bernek (born 13 April 1992) is a Hungarian swimmer. He competed for Hungary at the 2012 Summer Olympics.
Bernek is represented by Career Sport Management.

References

External links
 

Hungarian male swimmers
Swimmers at the 2012 Summer Olympics
Swimmers at the 2016 Summer Olympics
Olympic swimmers of Hungary
1992 births
Living people
Swimmers at the 2010 Summer Youth Olympics
European Aquatics Championships medalists in swimming
Medalists at the FINA World Swimming Championships (25 m)
Swimmers from Budapest
Male medley swimmers
Male backstroke swimmers
Hungarian male freestyle swimmers
Youth Olympic gold medalists for Hungary
Swimmers at the 2020 Summer Olympics